"Hot in Herre" is a song by American rapper Nelly, released as the first single from his second studio album Nellyville (2002). It was released on May 7, 2002, by Universal Records. It was written by Nelly, Charles Brown, and the producers the Neptunes. It features additional vocals by former labelmate Dani Stevenson and incorporates its hook from Chuck Brown's 1979 single "Bustin' Loose".

Awards and accolades
On April 15, 2002, "Hot in Herre" received over 760,000 streams on AOL Music's First Listen feature following its debut, setting a record for the website. The song was the inaugural winner of the Grammy Award for Best Male Rap Solo Performance at the 45th Annual Grammy Awards on February 23, 2003. In 2008, it was ranked number 36 on VH1's "100 Greatest Songs of Hip Hop".

Commercial performance
The song was Nelly's first number one hit on the US Billboard Hot 100 and in Canada. It peaked at number four in the United Kingdom and reached the top 10 in several other international markets. The song was number three on the Billboard Year-End Hot 100 Singles Chart for 2002.

The 2014 Hot 105.7 radio stunt
In 2014, the radio station Hot 105.7 played the song on an endless loop to promote its change from a Latin music station. The marathon lasted 72 hours and made worldwide headlines.

Music video
There were two music videos made for the single "Hot in Herre": one set in a dance club, and an alternative one shot at the St. Louis Arch. The alternative video was played on MTV Europe instead of the official one. The original video features cameo appearances by actor and comedian Cedric the Entertainer, NBA player Carmelo Anthony, and NFL players T. J. Duckett and Julius Peppers. One scene of the music video features Nelly and the clubgoers shouting the chorus for "The Roof Is on Fire" while there's a fire actually burning in the club.

Track listings

US CD single
 "Hot in Herre" (radio edit) – 3:50
 "Hot in Herre" (clean album version) – 3:50

US 12-inch single
A1. "Hot in Herre" (clean—with drops) – 3:50
A2. "Hot in Herre" (clean—no drops) – 3:50
B1. "Hot in Herre" (album version) – 3:50
B2. "Hot in Herre" (instrumental) – 3:50

Canadian and European CD single
 "Hot in Herre" (radio edit) – 3:50
 "Hot in Herre" (X-Ecutioners remix) – 3:58

UK CD and cassette single
 "Hot in Herre" (radio edit) – 3:50
 "Hot in Herre" (X-Ecutioners remix) – 3:58
 "Not in My House" – 2:58

UK 12-inch single
A1. "Hot in Herre" (X-Ecutioners remix) – 3:58
A2. "Hot in Herre" (radio edit) – 3:50
B1. "Hot in Herre" (Third Eye remix) – 4:57

Australasian CD single 1
 "Hot in Herre" (radio edit) – 3:50
 "Hot in Herre" (Third Eye remix) – 4:57
 "Hot in Herre" (Maximum Risk remix) – 3:51
 "Kings Highway" – 5:31

Australasian CD single 2
 "Hot in Herre" (radio edit) – 3:50
 "Hot in Herre" (X-Ecutioners remix) – 3:58
 "Not in My House" – 2:58
 "Hot in Herre" (Corporate remix) – 3:36

Charts

Weekly charts

Year-end charts

Decade-end charts

All-time charts

Certifications

Release history

References

2002 songs
2002 singles
Nelly songs
Billboard Hot 100 number-one singles
Canadian Singles Chart number-one singles
Music videos directed by Bille Woodruff
Music videos directed by Director X
Song recordings produced by the Neptunes
Songs written by Chad Hugo
Songs written by Pharrell Williams
Grammy Award for Best Male Rap Solo Performance
Universal Records singles